Vijaypur Assembly constituency may refer to 
 Vijaypur, Madhya Pradesh Assembly constituency
 Vijaypur, Jammu and Kashmir Assembly constituency